Ausable Chasm is a sandstone gorge and tourist attraction located near the hamlet of Keeseville, New York, United States. It is directly due west of Port Kent. The Ausable River runs through it and then empties into Lake Champlain. It is fed by the Rainbow Falls at its southern extreme.

Geological formation
Geologically simple, the Ausable Gorge was carved out of 500 million-year-old Potsdam Sandstone from the Cambrian Period. Since the end of the Pleistocene Epoch ice age 10,000 years ago, the movement and subsequent melting of glaciers created a series of caves and tunnels, which the Ausable River linked up and exploited on its  journey to Lake Champlain. During this time, the headward erosion of ancestral Rainbow Falls led to its location today, where the visitor's center was built.

Some of the rock formations have been given names such as Cathedral, The Devil's Oven, Elephant's Head, The Flume, Sentinel Rock, and Table Rock.

Tourism

In 1760, Major John Howe explored the chasm on ropes. Five years later, Irish settler William Gilliland wrote about the Chasm in his journal: "It is a most admirable sight, appearing on each side like a regular built wall, somewhat ruinated, and one would think that this prodigious clift was occasioned by an earthquake, their height on each side is from 40 to 100 feet in the different places; we saw about a half a mile of it, and by its appearance where we stopped it may continue very many miles further." Called by some the "Little Grand Canyon of the East", the  chasm opened to the public in 1870.

Cultural attractions
North Star Underground Railroad Museum, commemorating the Underground Railroad and operated by the North Country Underground Railroad Historical Association, is on Mace Chasm Road in Ausable Chasm, New York on County Route 71, south of the junction of County Route 373 and U.S. 9.

Gallery

References

External links

 Official website of Ausable Chasm
 Official website of the North Star Underground Railroad Museum

Landmarks in New York (state)
Landforms of Clinton County, New York
Tourist attractions in Clinton County, New York
Canyons and gorges of New York (state)